Dowrick is a surname. Notable people with the surname include:

 Gabriel Dowrick (born 1983), Australian screenwriter and editor
 McKenzie Dowrick (born 2000), Australian rules footballer
 Stephanie Dowrick (born 1947), Australian writer, minister, and social activist